HMS Russell was a  pre-dreadnought battleship of the Royal Navy commissioned in 1903. The Duncan-class battleships were armed with a main battery of four  guns and they were broadly similar to the s, though of a slightly reduced displacement and thinner armour layout. Russell was built between her keel laying in March 1899 and her completion in February 1903.

Russell served with the Mediterranean Fleet until 1904, at which time she was transferred to the Home Fleet; in 1905 the Home Fleet became the Channel Fleet. She moved to the Atlantic Fleet in early 1907 before returning to the Mediterranean Fleet in 1909. In another fleet reorganisation in 1912, the Mediterranean Fleet became part of the Home Fleet and it was later transferred to British waters. Russell served as the flagship of the 6th Battle Squadron from late 1913 until the outbreak of the First World War in August 1914.

After the start of the war, Russell was assigned to the Grand Fleet and worked with the fleet's cruisers on the Northern Patrol, and in November, she bombarded German-occupied Zeebrugge. In November 1915 she was sent to the Mediterranean to support the Dardanelles Campaign, though she did not see extensive use there. On 27 April 1916 she was sailing off Malta when she struck two mines laid by a German U-boat. Most of her crew survived the sinking, though 125 men were killed.

Design

The Russian ships were fast second-class battleships, so William Henry White, the British Director of Naval Construction, designed the Duncan class to match the purported top speed of the Russian vessels. The Duncans proved to be disappointments in service, owing to their reduced defensive characteristics, though they were still markedly superior to the Peresvets they had been built to counter.

The Duncan-class battleships displaced  normally and up to  fully loaded. Her crew numbered 720 officers and ratings. The Duncan-class ships were powered by a pair of 4-cylinder triple-expansion engines that drove two screws, with steam provided by twenty-four Belleville boilers. The boilers were trunked into two funnels located amidships. This made Russell and her sisters the fastest battleships in the world for several years.

Russell had a main battery of four  40-calibre guns mounted in twin-gun turrets fore and aft. The ships also mounted a secondary battery of twelve  45-calibre guns mounted in casemates, in addition to ten 12-pounder  guns and six 3-pounder  guns for defence against torpedo boats. As was customary for battleships of the period, she was also equipped with four  torpedo tubes submerged in the hull.

Her conning tower had 12-inch-thick sides.

Operational history

Pre-World War I

Russell was named after Edward Russell, 1st Earl of Orford, a former Royal Navy officer and Commander-in-Chief of the Navy in the 17th century. She was laid down by Palmers Shipbuilding and Iron Company at Jarrow on 11 March 1899 and launched on 19 February 1901. She arrived at Sheerness later the same month and went to Chatham Dockyard for steam and gun-mounting trials. Construction of Russell was completed in February 1903. During her sea trials, she was painted in the black and buff paint scheme used during the Victorian period, though after entering service she was repainted in the new grey paint scheme.

Russell commissioned at Chatham Dockyard on 19 February 1903 for service in the Mediterranean Fleet, in which she served until April 1904. On 7 April 1904 she recommissioned for service in the Home Fleet. When the Home Fleet became the Channel Fleet in January 1905, she became a Channel Fleet unit. She transferred to the Atlantic Fleet in February 1907.

In 1909, Russell had her armament overhauled, which included the installation of new traversing and elevation gear and sighting equipment. She also had identification bands painted onto her funnels. On 30 July 1909, Russell transferred to the Mediterranean Fleet. Under a fleet reorganisation of 1 May 1912, the Mediterranean Fleet became the 4th Battle Squadron, First Fleet, Home Fleet, and changed its base from Malta to Gibraltar; Russell transferred to home waters in August 1912. In September 1913, Russell was reduced to a nucleus crew in the commissioned reserve and assigned to the 6th Battle Squadron, Second Fleet. Beginning in December 1913, she served as Flagship, 6th Battle Squadron, and Flagship, Rear Admiral, Home Fleet, at the Nore. During this period, the ship had her anti-torpedo nets removed.

On 7–8 July 1914, Russell ferried representatives of the British government, led by Lord Beauchamp, from Dover to Guernsey to attend the unveiling of a monument to Victor Hugo. French government representatives were carried by the French cruiser Dupetit-Thouars.

World War I

North Sea and the Channel

However, plans also existed for the 6th Battle Squadron to be assigned to the Grand Fleet. When the war began, the Commander-in-Chief, Grand Fleet, Admiral Sir John Jellicoe, requested that Russell and her four surviving sister ships of the Duncan class (Albemarle, Cornwallis, Duncan, and Exmouth) be assigned to the 3rd Battle Squadron in the Grand Fleet for patrol duties to make up for the Grand Fleet's shortage of cruisers. Accordingly, the 6th Battle Squadron was abolished temporarily. Russell, Exmouth, and Albemarle were the only ships in a condition to immediately join Jellicoe, so they left without the rest of the squadron on 5 August. They arrived in Scapa Flow on the night of 7–8 August. The ships worked with Grand Fleet cruisers on the Northern Patrol.

The following day, the German fleet raided Yarmouth; at the time, Russell and the rest of the 3rd Squadron were dispersed on the Northern Patrol, and were thus unavailable during the German attack. On 13 November 1914 the King Edward VII-class ships returned to the Grand Fleet, but Russell and the other Duncans stayed in the Channel Fleet, where they reconstituted the 6th Battle Squadron on 14 November 1914, with Russell serving as the squadron's flagship. The squadron was based at Portland, although it transferred immediately, 14 November, to Dover. However, due a lack of antisubmarine defences at Dover, particularly after the harbour's anti-submarine boom was swept away in a gale, it returned to Portland on 19 November 1914.

The 6th Battle Squadron was given a mission of bombarding German submarine bases on the coast of Belgium, and Russell participated in the bombardment of German submarine facilities at Zeebrugge on 23 November 1914 in company with Exmouth. The two ships left Portland on 21 November accompanied by eight destroyers, a group of trawlers, and a pair of airships to observe the fall of shot, though the airships failed to arrive in time for the operation. The two ships fired some 400 shells in total and observed several fires ashore; reports from Dutch observers indicated significant damage had been inflicted, but the attack achieved very little and discouraged the Royal Navy from continuing such bombardments.

The 6th Battle Squadron returned to Dover in December 1914, then transferred to Sheerness on 30 December to relieve the 5th Battle Squadron there in guarding against a German invasion of the United Kingdom. Between January and May 1915, the 6th Battle Squadron was dispersed. Russell and Albemarle remained with the Grand Fleet through April; on 19 April, they were detached from the fleet base at Rosyth to conduct training exercises in Scapa Flow. They rejoined the fleet for a sortie on 21 April Russell left the squadron in April 1915 and rejoined the 3rd Battle Squadron in the Grand Fleet at Rosyth. She underwent a refit at Belfast in October–November 1915. During this refit she received a pair of  anti-aircraft guns on her quarterdeck.

Mediterranean

On 6 November 1915, a division of the 3rd Battle Squadron consisting of battleships  (the flagship), Albemarle, and Russell was detached from the Grand Fleet to reinforce the British Dardanelles Squadron in the Gallipoli Campaign at the Gallipoli Peninsula. Russell was at that time in Belfast, and she joined the other ships while they were en route. Albemarle had to turn back almost immediately due to heavy weather damage, but the other ships continued to the Mediterranean, where Russell took up her duties at the Dardanelles in December 1915, based at Mudros with Hibernia and held back in support.  Her only action in the campaign was her participation in the evacuation of Cape Helles from 7 January to 9 January 1916, and she was the last battleship of the British Dardanelles Squadron to leave the area. She relieved Hibernia as Divisional Flagship, Rear Admiral, in January 1916.

After the conclusion of the Dardanelles campaign, Russell stayed on in the eastern Mediterranean. Russell was steaming off Malta early on the morning of 27 April 1916 when she struck two naval mines that had been laid by the German submarine . A fire broke out in the after part of the ship and the order to abandon ship was passed; after an explosion near the after  turret, she took on a dangerous list. However, she sank slowly, allowing most of her crew to escape. A total of 27 officers and 98 ratings were lost. John H. D. Cunningham served aboard her at the time as a lieutenant commander and survived her sinking; he would one day become First Sea Lord.

According to the naval historian R. A. Burt, insufficient internal subdivision, which limited the ability of the crew to counter-flood to offset underwater damage, contributed significantly to the loss of Russell and her sister Cornwallis, both of which listed badly before sinking.

Her stern was blown off by the mine.

Footnotes

Notes

Citations

References

Further reading
 
 
 
 

 

Duncan-class battleships
1901 ships
Ships built on the River Tyne
World War I battleships of the United Kingdom
Ships sunk by mines
World War I shipwrecks in the Mediterranean Sea
Shipwrecks of Malta